Little Barrington is a village and former civil parish, now in the parish of Barrington, in the Cotswold district of Gloucestershire, England. In 1931 the parish had a population of 84.

The Church of St Peter in Little Barrington was built in the late 12th century. It is a grade I listed building.

The Fox Inn, beside the River Windrush, is a Grade II listed building.  South of the village, on the A40 road from Oxford to Cheltenham, the Inn for All Seasons is a coaching inn, historically known as the New Inn, also a listed building.

The village is grouped around a triangular green in a fold of the Windrush valley. Historically the village east of the green was in the ancient parish of Little Barrington, whereas the village west of the green was part of the ancient parish of Great Barrington.  In 1866 the two parishes became civil parishes, but on 1 April 1935 were abolished and merged to form the civil parish of Barrington. 

Barrington Grove, east of the village, is a manor house dating from the 17th century.

Famous people
The Venerable Edmond Francis Crosse, the first Archdeacon of Chesterfield, is buried in the church yard in Little Barrington.

References

External links

The Fox Inn, Little Barrington
Inn for All Seasons

Villages in Gloucestershire
Former civil parishes in Gloucestershire
Cotswold District